Give Out But Don't Give Up is the fourth studio album by Scottish rock band Primal Scream. It was released on 28 March 1994 in the United Kingdom by Creation Records and in the United States by Sire Records. It peaked at number 2 on the UK Albums Chart. Musically, it marked a massive departure from the psychedelic sound of their previous studio album Screamadelica (1991) into one influenced by classic rock and blues music. Its cover photo is a cropped version of Troubled Waters by American photographer William Eggleston.

The album peaked at number 22 on the US Billboard Heatseekers chart.

A second version of the album, featuring previously lost recordings, was released in 2018 as Give Out But Don’t Give Up: The Original Memphis Recordings.

Track listing

Personnel
Credits adapted from liner notes.

 Bobby Gillespie – lead vocals
 Denise Johnson – vocals (4, 6, 10)
 George Clinton – vocals (4, 10)
 Jackie Johnson – vocals
 Susan Marshall – vocals
 Robert Young – guitar
 Andrew Innes – guitar
 Martin Duffy – keyboards
 Jim Dickinson – keyboards
 Amp Fiddler – keyboards
 Benmont Tench – keyboards
 David Hood – bass guitar

 George Drakoulias – bass guitar, drums
 Henry Olsen – bass guitar
 Marco Nelson – bass guitar
 Roger Hawkins – drums
 Tony Brock – drums
 Phillip "Toby" Tomanov – drums
 Greg Morrow – percussion
 David Minnick – percussion
 Andrew Love (The Memphis Horns) – horn section
 Wayne Jackson (The Memphis Horns) – horn section
 Charlie Jacobs – harmonica
 William Eggleston – cover photography

Charts

The Original Memphis Recordings

In October 2018, the band released Give Out But Don’t Give Up: The Original Memphis Recordings featuring original mixes of tracks recorded by producer Tom Dowd at Ardent Studios, Memphis, with the Muscle Shoals rhythm section in 1993.

Aware of the success of Screamadelica, Creation Records' Alan McGee "thought the Memphis sessions too flat." As a result, the tracks were subsequently re-worked for the official 1994 release of the album, and the original recordings remained forgotten until guitarist Andrew Innes rediscovered the tapes in his basement.

Critical response to the Memphis release was positive, with God Is In The TV describing the collection as "a restrained, heartfelt, tearjerking tribute to the classic Muscle Shoals sound and very possibly the best album of [Primal Scream's] career."

Discussing hearing the material after 25 years, Bobby Gillespie said it "sounded really beautiful, really clear, well-produced; incredibly performed by all the players and musicians and singers… I was blown away when I heard it."

The story behind the rediscovery of the tapes was explored in the documentary, Primal Scream: The Lost Memphis Tapes.

The Original Memphis Recordings - Track listing

References

External links
 

1994 albums
2018 albums
Primal Scream albums
Creation Records albums
Albums produced by George Drakoulias
Albums produced by Tom Dowd
Boogie rock albums